Guns N' Roses is an American hard rock band from Los Angeles, California. Formed in 1985, the group originally consisted of vocalist Axl Rose, lead guitarist Tracii Guns, rhythm guitarist Izzy Stradlin, bassist Ole Beich and drummer Rob Gardner. The band has been through many lineup changes and currently includes Rose (a constant member), bassist Duff McKagan (from 1985 to 1997, and since 2016), lead guitarist Slash (from 1985 to 1996, and since 2016), keyboardist Dizzy Reed (since 1990), rhythm guitarist Richard Fortus (since 2002), drummer Frank Ferrer (since 2006) and keyboardist Melissa Reese (since 2016).

History

1985–1997
Guns N' Roses was formed in March 1985 by vocalist Axl Rose and rhythm guitarist Izzy Stradlin of Hollywood Rose, with lead guitarist Tracii Guns, bassist Ole Beich and drummer Rob Gardner of L.A. Guns. Before the group's first show on March 26, 1985, Beich was fired and replaced by Duff "Rose" McKagan. Shortly thereafter, Guns and Gardner were replaced by Slash and Steven Adler, respectively, both of whom had previously played with McKagan in Road Crew. The group released Appetite for Destruction in 1987, which as of 2017 had reportedly sold more than 30 million copies. During the resulting concert tour, Adler broke his hand in a fight and was replaced for a run of shows by Cinderella drummer Fred Coury. McKagan also missed a show in May 1988 when he got married, with The Cult's Kid "Haggis" Chaos substituting for the bassist.

G N' R Lies was released in 1988, selling almost 10 million copies worldwide as of 2018. Eagles drummer Don Henley performed with the group at the 1989 American Music Awards, after Adler was admitted to rehab for increasing drug problems. By the following July, the drummer had been fired from the band for his continued problems with substance abuse, with The Cult's Matt Sorum taking his place. Adler's last recording with Guns N' Roses was the Use Your Illusion II single "Civil War", which also featured newly-added sixth member Dizzy Reed on piano. The band's new lineup recorded Use Your Illusion I and II and embarked on the Use Your Illusion Tour in May 1991, a few months before their release. On November 7, however, Stradlin abruptly left Guns N' Roses due to the "air of chaos" which surrounded the band. He was replaced by Gilby Clarke, who debuted alongside fellow additions in touring keyboardist Teddy Andreadis, three backing vocalists and a three-piece horn section.

After the conclusion of the two-year long tour, Guns N' Roses released "The Spaghetti Incident?" in 1993, an album of cover versions. Work began the next year on a new studio album; however by October, Clarke had been replaced by Rose's childhood friend Paul "Huge" Tobias in time for the recording of their cover of "Sympathy for the Devil". Clarke was reportedly fired by Rose without the consent of the other band members, and Slash objected to the addition of Tobias, which led him to focus on his new side project Slash's Snakepit. Eventually, various differences led to the guitarist's departure in October 1996. He was soon followed by Sorum, who was fired in April 1997, after an argument with Rose regarding the hiring of Tobias. In August, McKagan became the final member of the Appetite for Destruction lineup to leave, explaining in his autobiography that the band was "so erratic that it didn't seem to fit with my hopes for parenthood, for stability".

1997–2015
Rose retained use of the Guns N' Roses name and began rebuilding the band in 1997. His first addition was former Nine Inch Nails guitarist Robin Finck, who joined to replace Slash in August on a two-year contract. He was followed early the next year by Sorum's replacement Josh Freese, who also signed a contract for two years, and McKagan's replacement Tommy Stinson. Later in the year, Chris Pitman joined on synthesizers & keyboards. The new lineup released "Oh My God" in 1999, which marked the first new Guns N' Roses material since in five years. In August, however, Finck left the band to return to Nine Inch Nails upon the expiration of his contract with Rose. He was replaced in March the following year by experimental guitarist Buckethead. Freese left shortly after his arrival, with the guitarist recommending Brain as his replacement. Finck later returned, and Guns N' Roses played its first live show in the US in seven years on December 31, 2000.

After eight years with the group, Paul Tobias left Guns N' Roses in July 2002, with Richard Fortus taking his place. Later in the year, the band embarked on the first leg of its extensive Chinese Democracy Tour, which was their first since 1993. After more touring, Buckethead abruptly left in March 2004, causing the band to cancel its appearance at Rock in Rio. The group continued work on new album Chinese Democracy, but didn't perform again until May 2006 when Buckethead's replacement Ron "Bumblefoot" Thal debuted. In June, Frank Ferrer temporarily replaced Brain for a run of shows, when the regular drummer was forced to return home earlier than expected to be with his pregnant wife. Brain ultimately chose not to return to the band, and Ferrer took over on a permanent basis. Chinese Democracy was released in November 2008, 15 years after the previous studio album, and with an estimated budget of $13 million in production costs.

In March 2009, Finck left Guns N' Roses for a second time to rejoin Nine Inch Nails, with Sixx:A.M.'s DJ Ashba taking his place. The band continued touring in the years following the 2008 release of Chinese Democracy, including the 2012 Up Close and Personal Tour which saw the group downgrading its production for a run of shows in smaller venues. The Appetite for Democracy tour, which began with a 12-night residency in Las Vegas, spawned the group's first live release since 1999, Appetite for Democracy 3D, in 2014. Reports of a follow-up to Chinese Democracy were made by various members of the band during these years, too, including Ashba and Fortus in 2012, and Rose and Reed in 2014. However, in July 2015 it was announced that Ashba had left the group to focus on Sixx:A.M. and his family. Around the same time, after much speculation, it was also confirmed that Thal had left after the conclusion of the 2014 tour. Stinson also left shortly after the tour for personal reasons.

2015 onwards
Despite the recent departure of three long-term members, Ferrer confirmed in July 2015 that Guns N' Roses "still exists" and was "moving forward". The following month, former lead guitarist Slash announced that he had become friends with Axl Rose again, after almost 20 years of not talking to his former bandmate. Alongside the recent departures of both lead guitarists, this fuelled renewed rumors of a potential reunion of the 'classic' lineup of Guns N' Roses, which continued as it was reported that the group was being touted for several European festivals in 2016. The rumours ultimately proved to be true to some extent, as it was announced in January 2016 that both Slash and bassist Duff McKagan would be rejoining Guns N' Roses for a headline performance at Coachella Festival. The reunion was later expanded into the Not in This Lifetime... Tour, which commenced in June. Richard Fortus, Frank Ferrer and Dizzy Reed remained present, while Melissa Reese took the place of Chris Pitman. The tour sustained for over two years without lineup changes, finally ending on November 2, 2019.

Members

Current

Former

Touring

Timeline

Session musicians

Lineups

Footnotes

References

External links
Guns N' Roses official website

Guns N' Roses
Guns N' Roses band members